Somalis and Italo Somalis in Italy are citizens and residents of Italy who are of Somali ancestry. The community is small, dating to the end of the Italian Empire.

Demographics
As of 2016, there were 7,903 immigrants from Somalia in Italy. In 2006, there were 6,414 residents. The three cities with the largest concentration of Somalis are: Rome (1,885), Turin (464) and Florence (443).

Notable individuals
 Jonis Bashir, singer and actor
 Dacia Valent, politician
 Saba Anglana, actress and singer
 Cristina Ali Farah, writer
 Igiaba Scego, writer
 Fabio Liverani, footballer
 Zahra Bani, athlete

See also

 Italian Somalis
 Kingdom of Italy

References

African diaspora in Italy
Ethnic groups in Italy
Italy–Somalia relations